Surrey-Guildford-Whalley was a provincial electoral district in the Canadian province of British Columbia in 1986 only.  The riding's predecessor was the Surrey riding, which first appeared in the 1933 election.

For other historical and current ridings in Vancouver or the North Shore see Vancouver (electoral districts).  For other Greater Vancouver area ridings please see New Westminster (electoral districts).

Electoral history 
Note:  Winners in each election are in bold.	

 
|Liberal
|Donald Alvin Ross
|align="right"|4,171 	 	 	 		 	
|align="right"|15.97%
|align="right"|
|align="right"|unknown

|- bgcolor="white"
!align="right" colspan=3|Total valid votes
!align="right"|26,111 	
!align="right"|100.00%
!align="right"|
|- bgcolor="white"
!align="right" colspan=3|Total rejected ballots
!align="right"|457
!align="right"|
!align="right"|
|- bgcolor="white"
!align="right" colspan=3|Turnout
!align="right"|%
!align="right"|
!align="right"|
|}

The population boom in Surrey saw Surrey further redistributed after 1986.  Current Surrey ridings are:

Surrey-Newton
Surrey-Panorama Ridge
Surrey-Tynehead
Surrey-Guildford-Whalley
Surrey-Green Timbers
Surrey-Whalley
Surrey-White Rock-Cloverdale
Surrey-White Rock
Surrey-Cloverdale

References 
Elections BC Historical Returns

Former provincial electoral districts of British Columbia
Politics of Surrey, British Columbia